This is the list of Wetlands of International Importance as defined by the Ramsar Convention for the conservation and sustainable use of wetlands, recognizing the fundamental ecological functions of wetlands and their economic, cultural, scientific, and recreational value. The convention establishes that "wetlands should be selected for the list on account of their international significance in terms of ecology, botany, zoology, limnology or hydrology." Over the years, the Conference of the Contracting Parties has adopted more specific criteria interpreting the convention text.

The Ramsar List organizes the Ramsar sites according to the contracting party that designated each to the list. Contracting parties are grouped into six "regions": Africa, Asia, Europe, Latin American and the Caribbean, North America, and Oceania. , 170 states have acceded to the convention and designated 2,471 sites to the list, covering ; two other states have acceded to the convention but have yet to designate any sites. The complete list of the wetlands is accessible on the Ramsar Sites Information Service website.

Africa

Algeria

Benin

Botswana

Burkina Faso

Burundi

Cameroon

Cape Verde

Central African Republic

Chad

Comoros

Congo (Republic of the Congo)

Côte d'Ivoire

Democratic Republic of the Congo

Djibouti

Egypt

Equatorial Guinea

Eswatini

Gabon

Gambia

Ghana

Guinea

Guinea-Bissau

Kenya

Lesotho

Liberia

Libya

Madagascar

Malawi

Mali

Mauritania

Mauritius

Morocco

Mozambique

Namibia

Niger

Nigeria

Rwanda

Sao Tome and Principe

Senegal

Seychelles

Sierra Leone

South Africa

South Sudan

Sudan

Togo

Tunisia

Uganda

Tanzania

Zambia

Zimbabwe

Asia

Bahrain

Bangladesh

Bhutan

Cambodia

China

India

Indonesia

Iran

Iraq

Israel

Japan

Jordan

Kazakhstan

Kuwait

Kyrgyzstan

Laos

Lebanon

Malaysia

Mongolia

Myanmar

Nepal

North Korea

Oman

Pakistan

Philippines

South Korea

Sri Lanka

Syria

Tajikistan

Thailand

Turkmenistan

United Arab Emirates

Uzbekistan

Vietnam

Yemen

Europe

Albania

Andorra

Armenia

Austria

Azerbaijan

Belarus

Belgium

Bosnia and Herzegovina

Bulgaria

Croatia

Cyprus

Czech Republic

Denmark

Estonia

Finland

France

Georgia

Germany

Greece

Hungary

Iceland

Ireland

Italy

Latvia

Liechtenstein

Lithuania

Luxembourg

Malta

Moldova

Monaco

Montenegro

Netherlands

North Macedonia

Norway

Poland

Portugal

Romania

Russia

Serbia

Slovakia

Slovenia

Spain

Sweden

Switzerland

Turkey

Ukraine

United Kingdom

Latin America and the Caribbean

Antigua and Barbuda

Argentina

Bahamas

Barbados

Belize

Bolivia

Brazil

Chile

Colombia

Costa Rica

Cuba

Dominican Republic

Ecuador

El Salvador

Grenada

Guatemala

Honduras

Jamaica

Nicaragua

Panama

Paraguay

Peru

Saint Lucia

Suriname

Trinidad and Tobago

Uruguay

Venezuela

North America

Canada

Mexico

United States

Oceania

Australia

Fiji

Kiribati

Marshall Islands

New Zealand

Palau

Papua New Guinea

Samoa

See also

 Ramsar Convention
 List of parties to the Ramsar Convention
 Ramsar Wetland Conservation Award

References

External links
 Ramsar List (PDF)
 Ramsar Sites Information Service

Lists of coordinates